Christie Van Hees (born July 5, 1977) is a Canadian retired racquetball player. Van Hees won two World Championships in women's singles and was the number one women's professional player at the end of the 2004-2005 season.

Professional career 
Van Hees's three US Open Racquetball Championships - the most prestigious pro racquetball title - are the third most by a woman behind Paola Longoria with six and Rhonda Rajsich with four. Van Hees won in 2000 and 2005, defeating Rajsich in the finals both years, and then again in 2006, when she defeated Cheryl Gudinas in the final. Her 2005 victory helped Van Hees finish that season as the #1 player in the women's professional rankings.

Canadian and international career 
Van Hees has won six Canadian Championships in 1997, 1998, 2000, and three consecutive years from 2006 to 2008.

Van Hees has won two International Racquetball Federation (IRF)  World Championships in 1998 and 2006.  She beat Kersten Hallander (USA) in the 1998 final, and Angela Grisar (Chile) in the 2006 final.

Van Hees also won the Girls 18 and under division at the IRF World Junior Championships in 1995.

Personal life 
Van Hees had considerable success early in her career, but then retired in 2001. But that turned out to be only a sabbatical, as she came back the fall of 2003, and had even greater success, reaching the final of the US Open in only her second tournament back.

In August 2009, Van Hees married Jack Huczek, an American, who is also a champion racquetball player having won three IRF World Championships. Originally from Kelowna, British Columbia, Van Hees currently resides in Dallas, Texas with Huczek and their two daughters, Evelyn and Faith.

Van Hees was inducted into the Central Okanagan Sports Hall of Fame on November 19, 2015.

References 

1977 births
Canadian racquetball players
Living people
Sportspeople from Kelowna
Pan American Games silver medalists for Canada
Pan American Games medalists in racquetball
Racquetball players at the 1999 Pan American Games
Medalists at the 1999 Pan American Games